Emanuele Nordi (born 23 April 1984) is an Italian footballer who plays as a goalkeeper.

Career
Born in Comacchio, in historic region Emilia, Nordi started his career in Serie D team CerGas Bologna (renamed to Crevalcore in 2003), which located in Crevalcore, near the region capital Bologna. In 2004, he left for Val di Sangro and in November left for Rovigo. In 2005, he was signed a professional club SPAL, which 48 km away from Comacchio. He spent  seasons as the first choice, ahead Marco Varaldi but replaced by Gianni Careri in December 2006.

In 2007, he left for Teramo. in 2008 he moved to the third division side Taranto, ahead Nicola Barasso and Davide Faraon as first choice. On 29 August 2009 he was signed by Gela. Since 2010–11 season he was backed by Angelo Maraglino and previously Gabriele Ferla.

On 23 August 2011 he was signed by Frosinone. In 2012, he moved back to Sicily by joining Trapani, and being instrumental in the club's historic first promotion ever to Serie B.

From 2014 to 2016 played for Alessandria; in October 2016 signing for Albinoleffe.

On 28 November 2018, he signed with Virtus Francavilla.

On 1 August 2019 he joined Sicula Leonzio.

On 21 March 2021 he signed with Pistoiese.

References

External links
 Football.it Profile 
 

1984 births
Sportspeople from the Province of Ferrara
Footballers from Emilia-Romagna
Living people
Italian footballers
Association football goalkeepers
Rovigo Calcio players
S.P.A.L. players
S.S. Teramo Calcio players
Taranto F.C. 1927 players
S.S.D. Città di Gela players
Frosinone Calcio players
Trapani Calcio players
U.S. Alessandria Calcio 1912 players
U.S. Catanzaro 1929 players
U.C. AlbinoLeffe players
Virtus Francavilla Calcio players
A.S.D. Sicula Leonzio players
U.S. Pistoiese 1921 players
Serie B players
Serie C players
Serie D players